The 2012 Donegal county football team season was the franchise's 108th season since the County Board's foundation in 1905. The team ended the season as All-Ireland champions after winning Sam Maguire MMXII.

Jim McGuinness returned for his second season as the team's manager. Pioneer of the game's revolutionary tactic The System, he entered the season having won the 2011 Ulster Senior Football Championship in his first season at the helm. Consecutive Ulster titles were a possibility, a first in team history, and the 2012 Ulster Senior Football Championship duly followed. McGuinness then became only the second manager, after Brian McEniff at the helm of the fabled Sam MCMXCII side, to lead Donegal to the All-Ireland title.

Panel

Competitions

Dr McKenna Cup

Conor McManus from Cork was part of the panel after transferring to Cill Chartha due to work commitments and being called into McGuinness's panel. He made his Donegal debut against UUJ at O'Donnell Park on 8 January, playing in midfield beside Neil Gallagher. He was half-time substitute against Cavan at Breffni Park on 15 January. His third and final appearance for the county came as a corner-forward against Derry at MacCumhaill Park on 18 January. McManus did not participate in Donegal's league campaign as by then his work brought him to Limerick, allowing him to return to his native club Clonakilty.

League

Ulster Senior Football Championship

All-Ireland Senior Football Championship

Post-season

Played under floodlights at Casement Park in Belfast on Saturday 3 November 2012, this game was held in memory of Michaela McAreavey. Donegal, in their first outing as All-Ireland champions, played a team comprising players from the rest of Ulster in an event intended to raise funds for The Michaela Foundation.

Kit

Management team
Manager: Jim McGuinness
Selectors: Rory Gallagher, Maxi Curran
Goalkeeping coach: Pat Shovelin
Strength and conditioning coach: Adam Speer
Surgical consultant: Kevin Moran
Team doctor: Charlie McManus
Team physio: Dermot Simpson 
Physiotherapists: Charlie Molloy, Paul Coyle, Donal Reid, JD.

Awards

All Stars
Donegal achieved eight All Stars, a record for a single season in team history. Karl Lacey was named All Stars Footballer of the Year.

County breakdown
 Donegal = 8
 Mayo = 4
 Cork = 2
 Dublin = 1

The Sunday Game Team of the Year
The Sunday Game selected Paul Durcan, Neil McGee, Frank McGlynn, Karl Lacey, Mark McHugh, Neil Gallagher, Colm McFadden and Michael Murphy on its Team of the Year.

Donegal News Sports Personality of the Month
 Frank McGlynn: June
 Neil Gallagher: August
 Michael Murphy: September

See also
 "Jimmy's Winning Matches", a song
 Jimmy's Winnin' Matches, a documentary

References

Donegal county football team seasons